Stanley Jones (16 March 1923 – 16 March 1973) was an Australian racing driver.

Today better known as father of 1980 World Drivers' Champion Alan Jones, Stan was a prominent racing driver himself, racing mainly in the 1950s. He is one of eleven drivers to have won the Australian and New Zealand Grands Prix. Jones raced the Maybach Specials, the last of the great Australian built specials to remain competitive against the imported European Formula 1 cars, before racing a Maserati 250F.

An amateur racer, his career declined along with the ability of his business interests (mostly car dealerships) to fund it. After two strokes Jones moved to London to be with his son Alan, and died just short of his 50th birthday.

Career results

References

Grand Prix drivers
1923 births
1973 deaths
Racing drivers from Melbourne